Cross Country is a series of lifted versions of Volvo models.

It has been used for the following cars:
1997–2007 Volvo V70 XC
2007–2016 Volvo XC70
2016–present Volvo V90 XC
2012–2019 Volvo V40 XC
2010-present Volvo V60 XC